Johannes Vold (born 12 May 1945) was a Norwegian football striker.

Playing ten seasons on the second and third tier with Bryne, he was picked up by Viking in 1971. Here he became league champion in 1972 and 1973 and joint top goalscorer in 1972. He represented Norway as a U19 and senior international.

References

1945 births
Living people
Norwegian footballers
Bryne FK players
Viking FK players
Norway youth international footballers
Norway international footballers
Association football forwards